Thomas Warren Sears (December 15, 1880 – June 1966) was a noted American landscape architect.

Sears was born in Brookline, Massachusetts to Alexander Pomeroy and Elizabeth Prescott (Jones) Sears. He received his A.B. in 1903 from Harvard College, followed in 1906 by his B.S. in Landscape Architecture as a member of Harvard's first graduating class in the field. After establishing an office in Providence, Rhode Island, Sears moved to Philadelphia and by 1917 had begun his own practice there, where he remained for the rest of his career.

His works listed on the U.S. National Register of Historic Places include the Reynolda Historic District, Reynolda Rd. Winston-Salem, NC (Sears, Thomas Warren) and Graylyn.

Selected landscapes 
 Mt. Cuba Center
 Reynolda Gardens
 Scott Outdoor Auditorium, Swarthmore College

References

 Ruth Dean, The Livable House: Its Garden, 1917
 Thomas W. Sears, Architecture and Design, September 1941 and November 1953.

External links
 
Thomas Warren Sears Collection from the Archives of American Gardens

1880 births
1966 deaths
American landscape architects
Harvard College alumni
People from Brookline, Massachusetts